Mariya Andreyeva may refer to:

 Maria Fyodorovna Andreyeva (1868–1953), Russian actress and Bolshevik administrator
 Mariya Andreyevna Andreyeva (born 1986), Russian actress